Vladimir Konstantinovich Mineev (born February 16, 1990) is a Russian Middleweight kickboxer and mixed martial artist.

Biography
Vladimir Mineev was born on February 16, 1990, in the suburbs of Sverdlovsk , then moved to Saransk with his family , and from the age of three he permanently lived in Ulyanovsk . Mineev's parents are doctors, his older brother also later became a doctor (St. Petersburg). He studied at school number 75, as a child he constantly fought on the street and at school. He began to engage in kickboxing in early childhood, was trained under the guidance of trainers E.V. Golovikhin and V.V.Safonin .

Mineev was brought to Golovikhin by his father when he was 9 years old. When Mineev was 14 years old, his father died, and Golovikhin helped him in every way. Golovikhin introduced Mineev to Vladimir Merchin, under whose leadership he won the Russian championship in Japanese kickboxing a year later.

Mineev trained with Viktor Safonin before the fight with Revankho Blockland. Safonin, together with another coach, Evgeny Belik, were able to develop a technique and strategy that helped Mineev win the duel. Mineev became a student at the Moscow State University of Environmental Engineering (now the Institute of Land Reclamation, Water Management and Construction named after A. N. Kostyakov Russian State Agricultural University named after K. A. Timiryazev), subsequently graduated from the university in this specialty 

In September 2022 Mineev, who is a military reservist and former paratrooper, was called up to serve in the 31st Guards Air Assault Brigade as part of Russia's partial mobilization.

Career 
He achieved his first serious success in the ring in 2008, when he became the champion of Russia in kickboxing for the first time and, having become a member of the Russian national team, won a gold medal at the European Championship in Portugal, held under the auspices of the W.A.K.O. A year later, at the European championship in Austria, he was defeated in the final match and received a silver medal. At the same time, he began his career in professional kickboxing, out of four fights he won in three, including winning the vacant heavyweight W.A.K.O. Pro K1 rules world championship according to WAKO Pro on December 5, 2009 , knocking out Belarusian Sergei Zelinsky in the second round. he knocked out Belarusian Sergey Zelinskiy in second round.

In 2011, Mineev took bronze at the European Championship in Macedonia and had several victorious fights at the professional level, became the European WBKF champion in the second heavy weight category. The following year, in competitions in Turkey, he again became the champion of the continent among amateurs, while in the professional he won six victories and won the WKA world champion title. In 2013 and 2014 he won and defended the WKN world champion belt. Also in 2013 he took part in the Russian Thai boxing championship, took second place, losing in the final to the multiple champion of recent years Artem Vakhitov.

He fought Ali Cenik at Fight Nights: Battle of Moscow 9 in Moscow, Russia on December 15, 2012. Mineev was down in round two but he was better fighter in first and third round and earned extra round. Extra round was also in the sign on Mineev and Cenik was in knockdown, which brought him decision victory.

Mineev took on another Dutchman when he fought Revanho Blokland at Fight Nights: Battle of Moscow on February 23, 2013, and won by KO in two.

He faced Thiago Beowulf for the WKN Kickboxing Heavyweight World Championship at Fight Night Saint Tropez in Saint-Tropez, France on August 4, 2013, winning by decision.

He defended WKN Kickboxing Heavyweight World Championship at Fight Night: Battle of Moscow XV event in Moscow, Russia on March 28, 2014, defeating Sergej Maslobojev by majority decision.

He beat Mikhail Tuterev at Fight Night Saint-Tropez II in Saint-Tropez, France on August 4, 2014.

In 2014, he made his debut in fights according to mixed rules , began to perform mainly in tournaments of the Russian promotion company Fight Nights . Much attention was drawn to Mineev's fight with Magomed Ismailov , which took place on October 19, 2018, at the Fight Nights Global 90: Mineev vs. Ismailov. The fight lasted 5 rounds and ended in a draw. The decision of the judges caused a lot of controversy.  In February 2020, Mineev announced that a verbal agreement had been reached on revenge with Ismailov.

At the FNG / GFC: Abdulmanap Nurmagomedov Memory Tournament, held on September 9, 2020, in Moscow , Mineev knocked out Dauren Ermekov and became the AMC Fight Nights Middleweight Championship.

On October 16, 2021, at AMC Fight Nights 105, Mineev rematched Magomed Ismailov with the AMC Fight Nights Middleweight Championship on the line. Mineev won the bout via TKO in the third round.

Family 
Mineev's younger brother Pyotr, a Russian military serviceman serving in the 31st Guards Air Assault Brigade of the Russian Airborne Forces, was killed in action during the 2022 Russian invasion of Ukraine.

Titles
Professional
 2013 WKN Kickboxing Heavyweight World Champion -96.6 kg (1 Title Def.)
 2013 WAKO-Pro K1 Rules Cruiser Heavyweight World Champion -94.1 kg
 2012 WKA Kickboxing Heavyweight World Champion
 2011 WBKF K-1 Rules European Champion 
 2009 WAKO-Pro K-1 Rules Super Heavyweight World Champion +94 kg

Amateur
2013 IFMA European Championship in Lisboa, Portugal  −91 kg (Muay Thai)
2012 W.A.K.O. European Championships in Ankara, Turkey  −91 kg (K-1 rules)
2011 W.A.K.O. World Championships in Skopje, Macedonia  −91 kg (K-1 rules)
2009 W.A.K.O. World Championships in Villach, Austria  −91 kg (K-1 rules)
2008 W.A.K.O. European Championships in Oporto, Portugal  −91 kg (K-1 rules)
2008 Russian K-1 kickboxing championship

Mixed martial arts

Fight Nights Global
Fight Nights Middleweight Championship (One time)
One successful title defence

Mixed martial arts record

|-
|  Win
| align=center| 16–1–1
| Magomed Ismailov
| TKO (punches)
|AMC Fight Nights 105
| 
| align=center| 3
| align=center| 4:40
| Sochi, Russia
|
|-
|  Win
| align=center| 15–1–1
| Dauren Ermekov
| TKO (elbows and knee)
|FNG / GFC: Abdulmanap Nurmagomedov Memory Tournament
| 
| align=center| 3
| align=center| 2:16
| Moscow, Russia
|
|-
|Win
|align=center| 14–1–1
|Artur Pronin
|TKO (punches)
|Leon Warriors Fighting League 
|
|align=center| 1
|align=center| 2:48
|Moscow, Russia
| 
|-
|Win
|align=center| 13–1–1
|Diego Dias
|Decision (unanimous)
|United Donbass 2
|
|align=center| 3
|align=center| 5:00
|Donetsk, Ukraine
| 
|-
|Win
|align=center| 12–1–1
|Milos Kostic
|KO
|King of Warriors 2
|
|align=center| 1
|align=center| 2:37
|Stavropol, Russia
| 
|-
|  Draw
| align=center| 11–1–1
| Magomed Ismailov
| Draw (split)
| Fight Nights Global 90: Mineev vs. Ismailov
| 
| align=center| 5
| align=center| 5:00
| Moscow, Russia
|
|-
|Win
|align=center| 11–1
|Pavel Masalski
|Submission (choke)
|Fight Nights Global 89
|
|align=center| 1
|align=center| 2:25
|Bozhou, China
| 
|-
|Win
|align=center| 10–1
|Andreas Michailidis
|TKO (punches)
|Fight Nights Global 71: Mineev vs. Michailidis
|
|align=center| 3
|align=center| 3:11
|Moscow, Russia
| 
|-
|Win
|align=center| 9–1
|Maiquel Falcão
|TKO (punches)
|Fight Nights Global 63: Alibekov vs. Khamitov
|
|align=center| 1
|align=center| 3:36
|Vladivostok, Russia
| 
|-
|Loss
|align=center| 8–1
|Maiquel Falcão
| Decision (majority)
| Fight Nights Global 56: Falcão vs. Mineev 
|
|align=center| 3
|align=center| 5:00
|Vladivostok, Russia
|
|-
|Win
|align=center| 8–0
|Yasubey Enomoto
| Decision (unanimous)
| Fight Nights Global 53: Day 2 - Mineev vs. Enomoto
|
|align=center| 3
|align=center| 5:00
|Moscow, Russia
|
|-
|Win
|align=center| 7–0
|Vyacheslav Belyaev
| Submission (guillotine choke)
| Industrials - Zabaikalian Power
| 
|align=center|1
|align=center|1:15
|Irkutsk, Russia
|
|-
|Win
|align=center| 6–0
|Boris Miroshnichenko
| Submission (rear-naked choke)
| Fight Nights Global 44: Machaev vs. Sarnavskiy
| 
|align=center|2
|align=center|2:55
|Moscow, Russia
|
|-
|Win
|align=center| 5–0
|Xavier Foupa-Pokam
| KO (punches)
| Fight Nights 19 - Battle of Moscow
| 
|align=center|1
|align=center|4:28
|Moscow, Russia
|
|-
|Win
|align=center| 4–0
|Josip Perica
| TKO (punches)
| Pankration MFP & Fight Nights 2
| 
|align=center|1
|align=center|3:55
|Vladivostok, Russia
|
|-
|Win
|align=center| 3–0
|Mikhail Shein
| TKO (punches)
| Moscow Region Cup
| 
|align=center|1
|align=center|4:08
|Khimki, Russia
|
|-
|Win
|align=center| 2–0
|Ivan Sedo
| TKO (punches)
| Grozny Battle
| 
|align=center|1
|align=center|3:58
|Grozny, Russia
|
|-
|Win
|align=center| 1–0
|Fernando Almeida
| TKO (punches)
| Fight Nights - Battle of Moscow 17
| 
|align=center|1
|align=center|1:15
|Moscow, Russia
|MMA debut.

Kickboxing and Muay Thai record

See also

List of WAKO Amateur World Championships
List of WAKO Amateur European Championships
List of male kickboxers

References

External links

Profile at FightLife.ru

Russian male kickboxers
Russian male mixed martial artists
Mixed martial artists utilizing kickboxing
1990 births
Living people
Sportspeople from Yekaterinburg